Güllük Gulf, also called Mandalya Gulf, is an Aegean gulf of Turkey.

The gulf is situated to the north of Bodrum Peninsula and to the south of Dilek Peninsula. Administratively, its coast is a part of Bodrum and Milas ilçes (districts) of Muğla Province, except for a small region, which is a part of Didim ilçe of Aydın Province.

The gulf is famous for tourist resorts such as Güllük, Torba, Güvercinlik and Türkbükü. The archaeological site of Iasos is also at the east coast of the gulf. Some coves on the eastern part of the bay are occupied by fish farms which threaten to spoil the environment.

References

Landforms of Muğla Province
Gulfs of Turkey
Bodrum District
Milas District
Gulluk
Important Bird Areas of Turkey